Carlow Borough was a Parliamentary constituency in Ireland, represented in the House of Commons of the United Kingdom of Great Britain and Ireland.  It returned one Member of Parliament (MP) from 1801 to 1885.

Boundaries
This constituency was the parliamentary borough of Carlow in County Carlow.

The borough was defined by the Parliamentary Boundaries (Ireland) Act 1832 as:

Members of Parliament

Elections

Elections in the 1830s

Maule was appointed as Baron of the Exchequer in England, requiring a by-election.

After meeting 59 times, an election committee amended the poll to 160 for Gisborne and 159 for Bruen and, in July 1839, Gisborne was declared elected.

Elections in the 1840s

Elections in the 1850s

Sadleir was appointed a Lord Commissioner of the Treasury, requiring a by-election.

Elections in the 1860s

Elections in the 1870s

Elections in the 1880s

References

  
 The House of Commons 1790–1820, edited by R.G. Thorne (Secker & Warburg 1986) 

Westminster constituencies in County Carlow (historic)
Constituencies of the Parliament of the United Kingdom established in 1801
Constituencies of the Parliament of the United Kingdom disestablished in 1885
Carlow, County Carlow